is a Shinto shrine in the Ichinomiya neighborhood of the city of  Tomioka in Gunma Prefecture, Japan. It is the ichinomiya of former Kōzuke Province. The main festival of the shrine is held annually on March 15. It is one of only three shrines in all of Japan where visitors enter from the top and descend downwards into the shrine; the other two are Udo Shrine and Kusakabe Yoshimi Shrine in Miyazaki and Kumomoto Prefectures respectively. Nukisaki Shrine is also featured on the 'yu' card in Jomo Karuta.

Enshrined kami
The kami enshrined at Nukisaki Jinja are:
 , god of war and tutelary deity of the Mononobe and Fujiwara clans
 , goddess of sericulture
Beppyo shrines

History
The Nukisaki Jinja is located on a fluvial terrace on the left bank of the Kabura River in southwestern Gunma Prefecture, facing the main route to Shinano. The origins of Nukisaki Jinja are unknown. Although there is no documentary evidence, the shrine clams that it was founded in the first year of the reign of the legendary Emperor Ankan, or in 534. The shrine first appears in the historical record in 806, and its first mention in national records is an entry in the "Shoku Nihon Kōki" in 839, followed by the Nihon Sandai Jitsuroku in 859. Emperor Uda decided to send an imperial messenger to the shrine for a once-in-a-lifetime memorial service in 888, but this did not take-lace until the enthronement of  Emperor Ichijō in 1017. It was regarded as the ichinomiya of the province from around 1100. During the Kamakura period and afterwards,  the shrine was patronized by the warrior class, including the Minamoto clan, Uesugi clan, Late Hōjō clan and Takeda clan, with the shrine times acting as an intermediary between the warring parties, and receiving donations of estates and for rebuilding in return. The current shrine structures were largely constructed under Shogun Tokugawa Iemitsu and Tokugawa Tsunayoshi in the early Edo Period. 

During the Meiji period era of State Shinto, the shrine was designated as a  under the Modern system of ranked Shinto Shrines. 

The shrine is located a 15-minute walk from Jōshū-Ichinomiya Station on the Jōshin Dentetsu Jōshin Line.

Gallery

Cultural Properties

National Important Cultural Properties
 , Edo period (1635), designated a National Important Cultural Property in 1912.
 , Edo period (1635), designated a National Important Cultural Property in 1976.
 , Edo period (1635), designated a National Important Cultural Property in 1976.
 , Tang Dynasty, designated a National Important Cultural Property in 1912.
 , Kamakura period, set of 2, designated a National Important Cultural Property in 1917.

See also
List of Shinto shrines
Ichinomiya

References
 Plutschow, Herbe. Matsuri: The Festivals of Japan. RoutledgeCurzon (1996) 
 Ponsonby-Fane, Richard Arthur Brabazon. (1959).  The Imperial House of Japan. Kyoto: Ponsonby Memorial Society. OCLC 194887

External links

Official home page
Tomioka City officialdom page

Notes

Shinto shrines in Gunma Prefecture
Kōzuke Province
Tomioka, Gunma
Ichinomiya